Sharif El Gariani (ash-Shārif al-Gharyānī) (1877–1945) was a Libyan religious sheikh and statesman.

Born in Janzour, near Tobruk, Libya, he was the nephew of Hussein El Gariani (from Gharyan in western Libya), co-founder of the first senussi Zawia at Bayda in 1844, and the man who was friends with a boy named Omar Mukhtar, (the future resistance leader in Cyrenaica against the Italian invasion).

After the Italian invasion of Libya, in 1911, Sharif had believed that the Italians were invincible, and this led to a long-term disagreement with his old friend Omar Mukhtar. His role in the next twenty years was to be a mediator between the resistance leaders and the Italian government in Libya.

Sharif El Gariani was demeaned in the film Lion of the Desert. Sharif was portrayed as a traitor offering his services to the occupying Italians, and who was ready to give any information that would lead to Mukhtar's capture.

References

"Omar al-Mukhtar: Nash'athu was Jihaduh men 1863 till 1931", Markaz Jihad Al Libiyeen Did al Ghazw al Itali", 1981.
"Cirenaica Verdi", By Attilio Teruzzi, translated to Arabic by Kalifa Tillisi.
"Cronistoria Della Cirenaica 1551-1911", P. Francesco Rovere, translated to Arabic by Ibrahim Ahmed El Mehdawi, Markaz Jihad Al Libiyeen li Dirasat at Tarikhiya, Benghazi, 2003.

Libyan Muslims
People from Tobruk
1877 births
1945 deaths